Albert Léon Delannoy (13 February 1881 in Paris – 19 May 1944 in Paris) was a French long jumper who competed in the late 19th century and early 20th century. He participated in the triple jump event at the 1900 Summer Olympics in Paris and although finished third in the qualifying he finished in fifth place overall.

References

External links
 

French male long jumpers
Olympic athletes of France
Athletes (track and field) at the 1900 Summer Olympics
1881 births
1944 deaths
Athletes from Paris